Ektomorf is a heavy metal band from Hungary.

Biography 
Ektomorf was founded in 1993 in Mezőkovácsháza, Hungary, a small city near the Romanian border, by Zoltán "Zoli/Zotya" Farkas. In the actual line-up Zoli/Zotya – songwriter and leader of the band – is the only remaining founder member. The band is completed by Szebasztián Simon (lead guitar), Csaba Zahorán (bass) and Dániel Szabó (drums).

Due to his Romani background, Farkas saw himself confronted with racism and prejudices, which is why the band had to put years of work into its international career. Their breakthrough came when Ektomorf started collaboration with Danish producer Tue Madsen in 2003.

From 2002 to 2021, they have released fifteen studio albums and one live album. On 7 September 2016, the band's single Az vagyok, aki voltam debuted on Rádió Rock 95.8.

Members 
 Zoltán "Zoli/Zotya" Farkas – vocals, rhythm guitar (1994–present) 
 Szebasztián Simon – lead guitar (2017–present) 
 Csaba Zahorán – bass (2018-present)
 Dániel Szabó – drums (2017–present)

Former members 
 Csaba Farkas – bass (1994–2008)
 Csaba Ternován – drums (1994–1998)
 Mihály "Müller" Janó – guitars (1994–1997, 1998–2000)
 Béla Marksteiner – guitars (1997–1998)
 József "Joci" Szakács – drums (1998–2009)
 László Kovács – guitars (2000–2002)
 Tamás Schrottner – guitars (2003–2010, 2012–2017)
 Szabolcs Murvai – bass (2009–2017)
 Gergely Homonnai – drums (2009)
 Michael "Mike" Rank – guitars (2010–2012)
 Gergely Tarin – drums (2010–2011)
 Róbert Jaksa – drums (2011–2017)
 Attila Asztalos – bass (2017-2018)

Timeline

Discography
 A romok alatt (1995)
Hangok (1996)
 Ektomorf (1998)
 Kalyi Jag (2000)
 I Scream Up to the Sky (2002)
 Destroy (2004)
 Instinct (2005)
 Outcast (2006)
 What Doesn't Kill Me... (2009)
 Redemption (2010)
 The Acoustic (2012)
 Black Flag (2012)
 Retribution (2014)
 Aggressor (2015)
 Fury (2018)
 Reborn (2021)

References

External links

Official website
 Official Facebook

Hungarian heavy metal musical groups
Musical quartets
Musical groups established in 1994
Groove metal musical groups
Nuclear Blast artists
1994 establishments in Hungary
AFM Records artists